The sulphur molly (Poecilia sulphuraria), locally known as molly del Teapa, is an endangered species of fish in the family Poeciliidae. It is endemic to Mexico, specifically to the Baños del Azufre (Grijalva River basin) near Teapa, Tabasco. The Baños del Azufre are sulfidic springs that contain high concentrations of toxic hydrogen sulfide. Poecilia sulphuraria has apparently evolved the ability to tolerate the toxic conditions. A few other Poecilia species are known from similar habitats in Mexico.

See also
 Widemouth gambusia (Gambusia eurystoma), another fish endemic to Baños del Azufre in Tabasco, Mexico

References

Further reading

External links
 

Poecilia
Endemic fish of Mexico
Fish described in 1948
Taxonomy articles created by Polbot